Regal Records was an American record label that issued popular music and jazz in the years after World War II. The label's headquarters were in Linden, New Jersey. This label was founded by David and Jules Braun, the founders of De Luxe Records, in 1949; it has no relation to the British, Spanish, or American versions from the 1920s. In the United States, there were also short-lived labels by this name based in California (1947–1949) and Michigan (1947), but these are unrelated to the Linden organization. This label also issued R&B and gospel music. A subsidiary called Tots and Teens issued children's records.

Regal's catalogue included Alberta Hunter and Cab Calloway.

See also
 List of record labels
 Regal Records (disambiguation)

References

External links
 J. C. Marion, Regal Records

American record labels
Record labels established in 1949
Jazz record labels
1949 establishments in New Jersey